George Denis Wise (12 May 1904 – 1 September 1971) was a New Zealand rugby union player. A wing three-quarter, Wise represented Otago and North Otago  at a provincial level, and was a member of the New Zealand national side, the All Blacks, in 1925. He played seven matches for the All Blacks, scoring five tries, but did not appear in any internationals.

References

1904 births
1971 deaths
Rugby union players from Dunedin
People educated at Otago Boys' High School
New Zealand rugby union players
New Zealand international rugby union players
Otago rugby union players
North Otago rugby union players
Rugby union wings